From late October to mid November 2021, the Allied Democratic Forces (ADF) and the Islamic State organization carried out four bombing attacks across Uganda.

Background
The Allied Democratic Forces (ADF) is an Islamic extremist terrorist group originated in Uganda but is based in the nearby Democratic Republic of the Congo. The group's insurgency began in 1996; it kills hundreds of civilians every year, mainly by attacking villages. The most deadly ADF attack in Uganda was on 8 June, 1998, when the group attacked the Uganda Technical College, Kichwamba in Kabarole District, killing 80 students and abducting about 100. In 1997, another major attack was carried out, when the group threw bombs into taxis and public buildings, killing more than 50 people and wounding about 160 others.

On 11 July, 2010, suicide bombings were carried out against crowds watching a screening of 2010 FIFA World Cup Final match during the World Cup at two locations in Kampala. The attacks killed 74 people and wounded 70 more. Al-Shabaab, a jihadist Somali terrorist group, claimed responsibility for the attacks as retaliation for Ugandan support for AMISOM.

Attacks in 2021 
After 11 years of relative calm, the ADF targeted Uganda in 2021 with the help of Islamic State-linked terrorists. 

On 1 June, General Katumba Wamala was travelling in a vehicle when four gunmen appeared and opened fire, wounding Wamala and killing his driver and his daughter. A month later, the authorities revealed that the attackers were Islamic extremists who were trained in a jihadist camp in North Kivu, Congo, and had links with the ADF and the Islamic State. 

On 27 August, the authorities arrested an ADF member for planning a suicide bombing attack at the funeral of a police commander, who was a major figure in the arrest of group's members. Between July and August, at least 25 civilians were killed in Lwengo and Masaka. The victims were killed in their houses and in the streets by knifemen during the night. While the motive behind the killings and the identities of the perpetrators is not confirmed so far, authorities suspected that ADF terrorists were behind the murders.

October 
On 8 October, Islamic State militants bombed a police post in Kawempe. Nobody was injured in the attack. It was the first time that the Islamic State claimed responsibility for an attack in Uganda. 

On 14 October, the United Kingdom issued a warning of an imminent terrorist attack, calling on their nationals to be extremely vigilant about their security "especially in crowded and public places like hotels, transport hubs, restaurants and bars, and during major gatherings like sporting or religious events." The Uganda Police Force issued a statement urging the public to keep calm as they "continue to review our security posture across the country which continues to be maintained as normal." The attacks are believed to be a retaliation for the recent round-up by the Ugandan police against persons believed to have links with Islamic State – Central Africa Province (IS-CAP). Uganda has also openly offered to help Congo fight the group and has maintained that all that is required is greenlight from Kinshasa to deploy to Beni.

At 9 p.m. on 23 October, a bomb exploded in a bar in Komamboga, a suburb in Kawempe North, Kampala, killing a waitress and injuring three other people. Three men, pretending to be customers, brought the bomb into the restaurant in a polythene bag and left it under a table, leaving before it exploded. On 24 October, the Islamic State claimed responsibility, saying they targeted the establishment because it is frequented by government employees.

At 5 p.m. on 25 October, a suicide bomber blew himself up on a bus in Lungala, Mpigi District, carrying 52 passengers. Three people were wounded in the attack. The bus was travelling between Masaka and Kampala. The attacker was the only one who died in the incident. A day later, authorities identified him as a member of the ADF.

On 29 October, two children were killed during a bomb explosion at a village in Nakaseke District. The device looked like an exotic “jackfruit” and was given to the children while they were playing. The victims were a 14-year-old and a disabled child.

November
On 16 November, at around 10:03 a.m., three suicide bombers rocked Kampala in a twin bomb attack within three minutes of each other. The first bomber blew himself up at checkpoint of the Central Police Station (CPS) just opposite Kooki Towers building along Buganda Road, killing two people and injuring several others, including police officers at the entrance of the police station. The explosion shuttered glass windows on the CPS building and the Kooki Tower building. Two other bombers then exploded at Jubilee House along Parliamentary Avenue about 100 meters from the entrance of the Parliament, killing two more people and injuring many others. The people killed were three civilians and one policeman. Thirty-three more were injured, including five in critical conditions. More bombs have been found in other parts of the city. The Islamic State claimed responsibility for the attacks. Security forces killed seven suspects and arrested 106 more in connection to the attack days later.

See also
2010 Kampala bombings
Assassination attempt on Katumba Wamala

References

2021 crimes in Uganda
2021 murders in Africa
2020s building bombings
21st century in Kampala
Allied Democratic Forces
Attacks on buildings and structures in 2021
Attacks on legislatures
Attacks on police stations in the 2020s
Attacks on restaurants in Africa
Building bombings in Africa
Bus bombings in Africa
Child murder
Crime in Kampala
ISIL terrorist incidents in Africa
Islamic terrorist incidents in 2021
Murder in Uganda
November 2021 crimes in Africa
November 2021 events in Africa
October 2021 crimes in Africa 
2021 disasters in Uganda

October 2021 events in Africa
Suicide bombings in 2021
Suicide bombings in Uganda
Terrorist incidents in Africa in 2021
Terrorist incidents in Uganda in the 2020s
Attacks in Africa in 2021
2020s murders in Uganda